Marghuz Village is a manor and Union Council of the Swabi District, Khyber Pakhtunkhwa, Pakistan.

References

Populated places in Swabi District
Union Councils of Swabi District